is an anime television series based on The Bible's Hebrew Scriptures (Old Testament) created by Osamu Tezuka. The series was a coproduction between Nippon TV, Tezuka's Tezuka Productions, and Italy's government-owned broadcaster, Radiotelevisione Italiana (RAI). Although the series was in production during a period of several years in the late 1980s and early 1990s, it was not aired in Japan until 1997, on the satellite channel WOWOW, while it premiered in Italy in 1992 on Rai 1. The series has also been aired on TV in the United States (on the Catholic-oriented Eternal Word Television Network), Spain, Germany, and Australia (on Australian Christian Channel).

In the Beginning marked the fourth time Bible stories formed the basis of a Japanese-animated television series, following the two Superbook series and The Flying House, which were made for Pat Robertson's Christian Broadcasting Network by Tatsunoko Production in the early 1980s.

In the Beginning features episodes devoted to most of the major Bible stories of the Old Testament, including the stories of the Creation, Cain and Abel, Noah's Ark, Abraham and Isaac, Joseph, Moses, David, and Solomon, with the final episode featuring the birth of Jesus Christ. As with the second Superbook series, some stories were stretched out over several episodes. Unlike Superbook and The Flying House, however, no contemporary characters from modern times were inserted into the stories, save for the series mascot and viewpoint character, Roco the fox (whose appearances were removed in the United States edit of the English dub).

Tezuka's manga work frequently included religious themes, and because of his long-running manga Buddha, he is sometimes perceived as having been a devout Buddhist, but in fact, Tezuka was largely agnostic.

The theme music (for the American version), an ending theme called "Rainbow Blue", is performed by Reimy.

Background

In the Beginning grew out of a request that Osamu Tezuka received from the Vatican by way of RAI in 1984, requesting that Tezuka produce an animated version of the Old Testament. Tezuka spent two years working on a pilot film for the project based on the story of Noah's Ark, both writing the scenario for the film and working in the production of the animation itself. However, Tezuka died in 1989 before the film was finished. The remainder of the production for the pilot film and the subsequent 26-episode television series was supervised by director Osamu Dezaki.

Staff

 Director: Osamu Dezaki
 Screenplay: Osamu Tezuka/Tezuka Production Co., Ltd.
 Character Designs: Osamu Tezuka, Shinji Seya
 Animation Direction: Masaki Yoshimura, Akio Sugino, Junji Kobayashi, Hideaki Shimada
 Music: Katsuhisa Hattori
 Production: Tezuka Production Co., Ltd. / Nippon Television Network / Radiotelevisione Italiana

Voice cast

 Mayumi Tanaka – Roco
 Kinryū Arimoto – Adam
 Yorie Terauchi – Eve
 Katsuhiro Kitagawa – Cain
 Mitsuru Miyamoto – Abel
 Yuzuru Fujimoto – Noah
 Sho Saito – Noah's wife
 Seizō Katō – Abraham
 Junko Midori – Sarah
 Ryuji Nakagi – Lot
 Katsumi Toriumi – Ishmael
 Tetsuya Iwanaga – Isaac
 Yonehiko Kitagawa – Jacob
 Hiroshi Yanaka – Joseph
 Manabu Ino – Young Moses
 Tessho Genda – Moses
 Takeshi Watabe – Pharaoh
 Osamu Saka – Aaron
 Mizuka Arima – Miriam
 Joji Nakata – Joshua
 Tomomichi Nishimura – King of Jericho
 Yurika Hino – Rahab
 Masato Yamanouchi – Samuel
 Hiro Yuuki – Young David
 Unsho Ishizuka – David, Abimelech & Cyrus
 Yu Shimaka – Goliath
 Takaya Hashi – Saul
 Akio Ohtsuka – Young Ezekiel
 Tamio Ohki – Old Ezekiel
 Ryuzaburo Ohtomo – Nebuchadnezzar
 Takeshi Aono – Belshazzar
 Shin Aomori – Solomon
 Motomu Kiyokawa – Prophet
 Hiroaki Hirata – Saint Joseph
 Yuri Amano – Mary
 Sho Hayami – Messenger of God
 Hidekatsu Shibata – God
 Akira Kume – Narrator

References

External links
 TEZUKA OSAMU OFFICIAL
 

1997 anime television series debuts
Japanese children's animated television series
Children's education television series
Christian children's television series
Christian animation
Christian entertainment television series
Christianity in Japan
Osamu Tezuka anime
Television series based on the Bible
Tezuka Productions
Wowow original programming